Gustavo González may refer to:

 Gustavo González (footballer)
 Gustavo González (swimmer) (born 1953), Argentine swimmer
 Gustavo González Castro (born 1973), Mexican drug lord
 Gustavo González Hernández (born 1970), Mexican politician
 Gustavo González López, Venezuelan politician